The Minnesota Whitecaps are a professional ice hockey team in the Premier Hockey Federation (PHF; formerly known as the National Women's Hockey League). They play in Richfield, Minnesota, part of the Minneapolis–Saint Paul metropolitan area, at the Richfield Ice Arena. Established in 2004, the Whitecaps were part of the Western Women's Hockey League (WWHL) during 2004 to 2011.

The team was independent, following the dissolution of the Western Women's Hockey League after the 2010–11 season. While independent, the Whitecaps' schedule consisted mostly of games against women's college ice hockey squads. The team also played some exhibition games against teams in the new National Women's Hockey League during the league's inaugural 2015–16 season but was not an official member of that league. On May 15, 2018, the NWHL announced they had acquired the Whitecaps and the team would officially join the league for the 2018–19 season.

The Whitecaps are the only team to have won both a Clarkson Cup and an Isobel Cup championship, the two major championships in professional women's ice hockey in North America, winning the Clarkson Cup in 2010 as a member of the WWHL and the Isobel Cup in 2019, their inaugural season in the NWHL.

The Whitecaps have also operated junior teams at the under-17 (U17) and under-19 (U19) levels.

History

WWHL era

The Whitecaps were formed by two Minneapolis–Saint Paul area hockey dads, Jack Brodt and Dwayne Schmidgall in 2004. They wanted to give their daughters – Winny Brodt-Brown, former Minnesota Golden Gophers player and U.S. national team member, and Jenny Schmidgall-Potter, a four-time U.S. Olympic medalist – a place to play after college. The Whitecaps were part of the Western Women's Hockey League (WWHL) from the fall of 2004 until the summer of 2006. In July 2006, it was announced that team, along with other WWHL teams, would be joining the National Women's Hockey League (NWHL) for the 2006–07 season. However, this was short lived as the NWHL and WWHL could not reach an agreement upon a playoff schedule. As a result, the merger was not consummated. With the collapse of the NWHL in the summer of 2007, the Western Women's Hockey League was a completely independent league.

The Whitecaps took three regular season championships in the WWHL, 2008–09, 2009–10 and 2010–11, qualifying to participate in the Clarkson Cup tournament for the Canadian women's ice hockey championships against teams from the Canadian Women's Hockey League.

During the qualifying WWHL rounds 2008–09, the Whitecaps won the semifinal match 4–0 over the Edmonton Chimos. The next day, the Whitecaps defeated the Calgary Oval X-Treme by the score of 2–0 in the championship match in Calgary. During the 2009 Clarkson Cup, the Whitecaps upset both the Brampton Thunder and the Calgary Oval X-Treme. The Whitecaps then played in the final match of the tournament but lost by a score of 3–1 to the Montreal Stars, who would take home the Clarkson Cup.

The following season, 2009–10, the Whitecaps took the WWHL Championship. The first match of the WWHL qualifying round took place on February 5, 2010, at the Minnesota Pagel Ice Arena and the Whitecaps defeated the Strathmore Rockies by a score of 6–3. During the second match on February 6 at Victory Memorial Ice Arena, the Whitecaps beat Strathmore by a score of 4–1. The third match on February 7 at the Graham Arena, Strathmore won 4–3 over the Whitecaps. The Whitecaps 2–1 record advanced the team to the 2010 Clarkson Cup tournament in Richmond Hill, Ontario. Whitecaps beat the Brampton Thunder 4–0 in final game and won their only Clarkson Cup.

The Whitecaps were defeated in all three of their round-robin matches in the 2011 Clarkson Cup.

Independent era
The Canadian Women's Hockey League (CWHL) announced on April 19, 2011, that it would merge with the Western Women's Hockey League for the 2011–12 season. The merger was to feature one team based in Edmonton and Calgary and would be combination of the former WWHL franchises, the Edmonton Chimos and Strathmore Rockies, called Team Alberta.

However, the CWHL decided against adding the Whitecaps and Manitoba Maple Leafs. The business manager of the Whitecaps, Kristie Minkoff, accused the Canadian Women's Hockey League of collusion against the participation of Whitecaps in the 2012 Clarkson Cup and making the team pay $200,000 expansion fee to the CWHL in order to play. The two teams attempted to continue operating the league, but lost several board members and were unable to put together a 2011–12 season. The two teams played a number of exhibition games while the league looked to expand with new teams. The WWHL never reorganized and effectively ceased operations. While independent, the Whitecaps' schedule consisted mostly of games against women's college ice hockey squads.

While independent, the Whitecaps did not have a home rink and reached out to Minnesota youth hockey programs that could either afford to buy ice time at rinks suitable for Whitecaps home games or had ice time donated to them. In exchange, the Whitecaps used part of that ice time to put on clinics for the youth players, who received free tickets to the games and whose hockey associations received 100 percent of the proceeds from ticket sales. Some programs raised more than $1,500 in a single night from the arrangement.

During the 2015–16 season, a new National Women's Hockey League (NWHL) began play in the Northeastern United States, and was the first women's hockey league to pay its players. The Whitecaps played four exhibition games against the NWHL teams, but were not an official member of that league. For the 2016–17 season, the Whitecaps scheduled no games against CWHL or NWHL teams, but had several games scheduled against NCAA teams and Shattuck-St. Mary's School.

In February 2018, Kate Schipper and Sadie Lundquist were invited to represent the Whitecaps at the NWHL All-Star Game and Skills Challenge, which were held at TRIA Rink in Saint Paul, Minnesota.

NWHL/PHF era

On May 15, 2018, the NWHL announced that it had an agreement in principle to acquire ownership of the Whitecaps and the team joined the NWHL as an expansion team for the 2018–19 season. They then made an agreement with the Minnesota Wild to use TRIA Rink, the Wild's practice facility, as the site for Whitecaps home games. It was reported that the Whitecaps had hired 2018 Olympic gold medal-winning coach Robb Stauber and his wife Shivaun Stauber as coaches, sharing the head coaching responsibilities, but the parties never signed a contract. Whitecaps' founder and general manager Jack Brodt then returned to the coaching position he held prior to joining the NWHL and hired former University of Minnesota player Ronda Curtin Engelhardt as co-head coach.

On August 21, the Whitecaps unveiled their new logo. During their first NWHL season, league commissioner Dani Rylan stated that the Whitecaps were the first team in the league to turn a profit by having a league-leading 500 season tickets sold, significant merchandise sales, and all home games were sold out through eight games. On March 3, 2019, the Whitecaps finished their inaugural NWHL season as the first seed and regular season champions. On March 17, 2019, the Whitecaps beat the Buffalo Beauts 2–1 in overtime to win the Isobel Cup league playoff championship. The Whitecaps also ended the season with the highest average attendance by selling out all ten home games including the playoffs.

After the season ended, Whitecaps founder Jack Brodt stated that, though the NWHL had reached an agreement in principal to purchase the team, the agreement was never signed and the Whitecaps remained privately owned at that time. By 2020, the Whitecaps were one of four teams listed as owned by W Hockey Partners, the ownership group that managed league-owned teams in the NWHL. On June 28, 2021, the league announced the sale of the Buffalo Beauts and the Whitecaps to joint partners NLTT Ventures, LLC, led by Andy Scurto, and Top Tier Sports, led by Neil Leibman. Leibman was named the team's governor.

In September 2021, the NWHL was restructured and rebranded as the Premier Hockey Federation (PHF).

Season-by-season results 

Note: GP = Games played, W = Wins, L = Losses, T = Ties, GF = Goals for, GA = Goals against, Pts = Points

Season events

2008–09
January 16: The Whitecaps participated in Hockey Day Minnesota. The team played the USA Selects Team.
March 8: The Whitecaps defeated the Calgary Oval X-Treme on March 8 in the WWHL Championship game shutting out Calgary by a score of 2–0. The Minnesota Whitecaps also won the semi-final game on March 7 against the Edmonton Chimos by a score of 4–0.
March 21: The Whitecaps participated in the inaugural Clarkson Cup. The final game pitted the Montreal Stars, the top team from the Canadian Women's Hockey League, against the Minnesota Whitecaps, the top team from the WWHL. Montreal won the Cup by a score of 3–1. Sanya Sandahl was selected as Minnesota's player of the game.

2009–10
 November 16: Chisago Lakes was host to the first scrimmage of the season between the Whitecaps and the USA National team.
 December 21: Jenny Potter, Angela Ruggiero, Julie Chu, Natalie Darwitz, Caitlin Cahow, Molly Engstrom, Lisa Chesson, Jinelle Zaugg-Siergiej and Karen Thatcher all former Minnesota Whitecaps will be playing in the 2010 Vancouver Olympic Games on February 12–28.
 On February 8, 2010, the Whitecaps clinched the WWHL Championship. The first game of the series on February 5, was held at Minnetonka's Pagel Ice Arena hosted by Minnetonka Youth Hockey Association. The Whitecaps beat Strathmore by a score of 6–3. Game two of the series was hosted by the NOVAS Girls High School Hockey team on Saturday, February 6, at Victory Memorial Ice Arena.
 March 28: The Whitecaps defeated the Brampton Thunder 4–0 in Richmond Hill, Ontario, Canada to win the Clarkson Cup.

2010–11

Exhibition

2011 Clarkson Cup

Independent schedules

From the 2011–12 season through the 2017–18 season, the Whitecaps played only exhibition games against CWHL, NCAA, high school and NWHL teams.

Exhibition games

Players and personnel

Current roster 

Coaching staff and team personnel
 Head coach: Ronda Curtin Engelhardt
 Assistant coach: Amber Hegland
 Goaltending coach: Brennan Poderzay
 Athletic trainers: Amy Hamilton & Christina Neville
 Conditioning coach: Noah Draper
 Equipment manager: Clark Woldum

Notable former players

Awards and honors 
 Natalie Darwitz, Western Women's Hockey League Most Valuable Player (2006–07)
 2008 Breaking Barriers Award: Presented at National Girls and Women in Sports Day in St. Paul
 2009 Clarkson Cup Top role model:  Julie Chu
 2009 Clarkson Cup Top defense:  Caitlin Cahow
 In March 2010, the Whitecaps became the first American team to win the Clarkson Cup
 2010 Clarkson Cup Most Valuable Player:Julie Chu
 2010 Clarkson Cup Final Player of the Game: Brooke White-Lancette

PHF
 Jonna Curtis, 2019 Newcomer of the Year
 Amanda Leveille, 2021 Goaltender of the Year
 Amanda Leveille, 2021 Foundation Award (Whitecaps' representative)

References

External links

 

 
Premier Hockey Federation teams
Western Women's Hockey League teams
Sports in Minneapolis–Saint Paul
Ice hockey teams in Minnesota
Women's ice hockey teams in the United States
2004 establishments in Minnesota
Ice hockey clubs established in 2004